Kerry is a parliamentary constituency that has been represented in Dáil Éireann, the lower house of the Irish parliament or Oireachtas, since the 2016 general election. The constituency elects 5 deputies (Teachtaí Dála, commonly known as TDs) on the system of proportional representation by means of the single transferable vote (PR-STV). Another constituency of the same name existed between 1923 and 1937.

History and boundaries

1923–1937
The constituency was created under the Electoral Act 1923, and first used at the 1923 general election to elect the Members of the 4th Dáil. It replaced the Kerry–Limerick West constituency which was used to elect members of the 2nd Dáil and members of the 3rd Dáil. It consisted of the administrative county of Kerry. The constituency elected 7 deputies.

It was abolished by the Electoral (Revision of Constituencies) Act 1935 and the new Kerry South and Kerry North constituencies were created. They were first used at the 1937 general election for the members of the 9th Dáil.

Since 2016
The Constituency Commission proposed in its 2012 report that at the next general election a new constituency called Kerry be created. The report proposed changes to the constituencies of Ireland so as to reduce the total number of TDs from 166 to 158.

It was established by the Electoral (Amendment) (Dáil Constituencies) Act 2013. The new constituency replaces the constituencies of Kerry North–West Limerick and Kerry South. It comprises the whole of County Kerry with the Limerick part of the Kerry North–West Limerick transferred to Limerick County.

The 2013 Act defines the constituency as:

TDs

TDs 1923–1937

TDs since 2016

Elections

2020 general election

2020 opinion poll

2016 general election

1933 general election

1932 general election

September 1927 general election

June 1927 general election

1923 general election

See also
Dáil constituencies
Elections in the Republic of Ireland
Politics of the Republic of Ireland
List of Dáil by-elections
List of political parties in the Republic of Ireland

References

External links
 Oireachtas Constituency Dashboards
 Oireachtas Members Database

Dáil constituencies
1923 establishments in Ireland
1937 disestablishments in Ireland
Constituencies established in 1923
Constituencies disestablished in 1937
2016 establishments in Ireland
Constituencies established in 2016
Politics of County Kerry